Winkin Sports Complex is a stadium in Bangor, Maine.  It is home of the Husson University baseball, field hockey, and football teams.  The ballpark has a capacity of 3,000 people and opened in 2004. It was formerly the home of Bangor Lumberjacks.

The complex was named in honor of retired head baseball coach John Winkin.

References

Baseball venues in Maine
American football venues in Maine
Minor league baseball venues
Tourist attractions in Bangor, Maine
2004 establishments in Maine
Sports venues completed in 2004
College baseball venues in the United States
College football venues
College field hockey venues in the United States
Baseball in Bangor, Maine
Husson Eagles
Buildings and structures in Bangor, Maine
Sports venues in Penobscot County, Maine